Kenneth Allen Miller Tolbert (born December 27, 1967) is a former professional basketball player. He attended Morgan Park High School on Chicago's South Side. Miller (a.k.a. The Big Mil) was the 1988 NCAA Division I men's basketball season rebounding leader, the first freshman in the history of the NCAA to do it. In 2001, he received dual citizenship with Spain.
2020 Net Worth 2-7mm

College career
Miller played at Loyola University where he won First Team All-MCC (Midwest Collegiate Conference), MCC Newcomer of the Year and the 1988 rebounding title.

Professional career
Miller played in the Continental Basketball Association, Global Basketball Association, NBA, Paris Basket Racing), Banco di Sardegna, Fenerbahçe, Galatasaray, Unicaja 9 season, Tenerife (1 season), UB La Palma and Olympiacos. In the off-season he played in Puerto Rico (Carolina league co-champion) and Bayamon Leagues, in Venezuela (Toros), Santo Domingo, Ecuador and Chicago Summer league.

Miller was voted the best imported player for Unicaja of Malaga. He led and held the record in field goal percentage at 72.32 in the 1997-98 season. Miller held the club record for games played (225).

References

External links

 

 
 
 

1967 births
Living people
Albany Patroons players
American expatriate basketball people in France
American expatriate basketball people in Greece
American expatriate basketball people in Italy
American expatriate basketball people in Spain
American expatriate basketball people in Turkey
American men's basketball players
Baloncesto Málaga players
Basketball players from Chicago
CB Gran Canaria players
Centers (basketball)
Dinamo Sassari players
Fenerbahçe men's basketball players
Galatasaray S.K. (men's basketball) players
Grand Rapids Hoops players
Liga ACB players
Loyola Ramblers men's basketball players
Olympiacos B.C. players
Rapid City Thrillers players
Rockford Lightning players
Tenerife CB players
UB La Palma players